Lethrinus nebulosus is a species of emperor fish. Common names include spangled emperor, green snapper, morwong, north-west snapper, sand bream, sand snapper, sixteen-pounder, Sharie, Sheri and yellow sweetlip.

Description

This species commonly grows to approximately 70 cm in length, however the largest individuals have been found to be 87 cm.[clarification needed] It is yellow to yellowish-brown or bronze in colour, the belly being lighter. It has scattered blue markings over the body. The cheeks have no scales and may have a vertical blue markings. It has whitish or yellowish fins with a yellowish-edged dorsal fin.

Distribution
This fish occurs in the waters of East Africa to the southern parts of Japan. It also lives in Australian coastal waters, and has been recorded in the Red Sea, Persian Gulf and New Caledonia, where it is one of the major commercial fish.

Habitat
Lethrinus nebulosus inhabits both marine and brackish waters at depths of between 10 and 75 metres. It is a non-migratory species, and is found on coral and rocky reefs, seagrass beds, mangrove swamps, as well as over sandy substrates. Juveniles may be found in large schools.

Diet
This species feeds mainly on mollusks, echinoderms, and crustaceans. It also eats polychaetes and other fish, but less commonly.

As food

Lethrinus nebulosus is sought after by recreational fishers and is considered to be delicious.

Parasites
As with most fish, Lethrinus nebulosus is the host of many species of parasites. 
Monogeneans parasitic on the gills include the diplectanids Calydiscoides difficilis, Calydiscoides duplicostatus and Calydiscoides terpsichore, an ancyrocephalid, and an unidentified polyopisthocotylean.
The pharyngeal teeth harbour a species of the capsalid monogenean Encotyllabe which is specialised to this special habitat.
Copepods parasitic on the gills include three species of the hatschekiid Hatschekia including Hatschekia  gracilis.  
The digestive tract harbours the opecoelid Macvicaria macassarensis and the zoogonid Diphterostomum tropicum.
In New Caledonia, where its parasites were studied, Lethrinus nebulosus has a total of eleven species of parasites.

Distribution and population
Spangled Emperor are a very commonly found fish in many locations. They can be found around East Africa, Japan, Australia, the Persian Gulf and the Red Sea. They usually inhabit waters 20-300 meters deep, but can be found shallower, more commonly near structure. 

Being a good eating fish, over exploitation of this species has significantly decreased the population especially in the Persian Gulf, where the development of Emirati fishing vessels has considerably decreased the amount of 'Sheri' or 'Sherry' caught. However, it is still being caught at near sustainable numbers, and its offshore populations remain of lower concern. Around 3000 tons of Lethrinus nebulosus is caught every year around the Persian Gulf.

Synonyms
Lethrinus alboguttatus Valenciennes, 1830
Lethrinus anatarius Richardson, 1845
Lethrinus aurolineatus MacLeay, 1882
Lethrinus carinatus Weber, 1913
Lethrinus centurio Valenciennes, 1830
Lethrinus choerorynchus Bloch & Schneider, 1801)
Lethrinus cyanoxanthus Richardson, 1843
Lethrinus devisianus Whitley, 1929
Lethrinus erythrurus Valenciennes, 1830
Lethrinus esculentus Valenciennes, 1830
Lethrinus fasciatus Valenciennes, 1830
Lethrinus fraenatus Valenciennes, 1830
Lethrinus frenatus Valenciennes, 1830
Lethrinus gothofredi Valenciennes, 1830
Lethrinus guentheri Bleeker, 1873
Lethrinus karwa Valenciennes, 1830
Lethrinus korely Valenciennes, 1830
Lethrinus maculatus Valenciennes, 1830
Lethrinus perselectus Whitley, 1933
Lethrinus scoparius Gilchrist & Thompson, 1908
Sciaena nebulosa Forsskål, 1775
Sparus choerorynchus Bloch & Schneider, 1801

References

External links

Lethrinidae
Fish described in 1775
Taxa named by Peter Forsskål